St. Stephen's African Methodist Episcopal Church is a historic African Methodist Episcopal church located at Hanover, Jefferson County, Indiana.

Early records of the church and its founding have been lost, but it is known that the trustees of the church purchased an acre of land in Hanover for $50 in 1892 to build a church. According to oral tradition among the church members, the present building was erected around 1904, using lumber salvaged from the 1834 Graysville Church formerly on Grange Hill Road.

The church is a one-story, rectangular wood-frame building with Queen Anne style design elements. It measures approximately 26 feet wide and 40 feet deep. It has a front gable roof and features a central projecting bell tower and entrance. It was listed on the National Register of Historic Places in 2000.

References

African Methodist Episcopal churches in Indiana
Churches on the National Register of Historic Places in Indiana
Queen Anne architecture in Indiana
Churches completed in 1904
Buildings and structures in Jefferson County, Indiana
National Register of Historic Places in Jefferson County, Indiana
1904 establishments in Indiana